The Indian grassbird (Graminicola bengalensis) is a passerine bird in the family Pellorneidae.  It was formerly placed in the Old World warbler family, Sylviidae, and the Old World babbler family, Timaliidae.

Distribution and habitat
It occurs in tall emergent vegetation in or bordering freshwater swamps or along banks of rivers in the lowlands of Bangladesh, northern India, Bhutan and the Chitwan National Park of Nepal. It is threatened by habitat loss.

The Sukla Phanta Wildlife Reserve in Nepal represents the western limit of its distribution.

References

 Collar, N. J., Robson, C. (2007) Family Timaliidae (Babblers)  pp. 70 – 291 In: del Hoyo, J., Elliott, A., Christie, D.A. (eds.) Handbook of the Birds of the World, Vol. 12: Picathartes to Tits and Chickadees. Lynx Edicions, Barcelona.

External links
 BirdLife International: Rufous-rumped Grassbird

Indian grassbird
Birds of India
Birds of Northeast India
Birds of Nepal
Indian grassbird
Indian grassbird
Taxonomy articles created by Polbot